Luckia is a genus of amphipod crustaceans in the family Pontogeneiidae, with the sole species Luckia striki. It is found in hydrothermal vents in the Atlantic Ocean.

Description

Luckia have compressed bodies and short rostra. Their body is smooth, and they have no eyes. The joints are slender and linear, with a cleft triangular telson. Their flagella have two parts, and their labrum is whole, with triturative molars. The outer rami are shorter than the inner ones, and they have a smooth third epimeral plate.

Distribution

The species has been found in the Lucky Strike site, over the Rainbow Hydrothermal Field, and at the Menez Gwen field.

Taxonomy

Amphipods are more common in Pacific hydrothermal vents than in Atlantic ones, and before 1996, only two species, Andaniotes ingens and Hirondellea brevicaudata were known to exist in the Atlantic. The genus was discovered by Denise Bellan-Santini and Michael H. Thurston in 1996, when it was collected in a vent along with shrimps, gastropods, crabs, and limpets at the Lucky Strike site above the Mid-Atlantic Ridge, the species's namesake.

References

Amphipoda
Monotypic crustacean genera